Stanley Dean Royer (born August 31, 1967 in Olney, Illinois) is a former third baseman/first baseman in Major League Baseball who played from  through  for the St. Louis Cardinals (1991–1994) and Boston Red Sox (1994). Listed at 6' 3", 195 lb., he batted and threw right-handed.

Drafted out of Charleston High School in Charleston, Illinois by the Atlanta Braves, Royer decided to not sign and attended college instead. Royer was selected by the Oakland Athletics in the 1988 draft out of Eastern Illinois University, from where he had earned an economics degree. Before the 1991 season, he was sent by Oakland along with Félix José and a minor leaguer to the Cardinals in the same transaction that brought Willie McGee to the Athletics.

In a four-season career, Royer was a .250 hitter (41-for-164) with 21 RBI in 89 games, including four home runs, 10 doubles, and 14 runs scored. He also played in the Oakland, St. Louis and Boston minor league systems from 1988 to 1994, hitting .270 with 72 home runs and 417 RBI in 707 games.

Royer is President of Claris Advisors, an investment advising and wealth management firm based in St. Louis.

Sources

Retrosheet

1967 births
Eastern Illinois Panthers baseball players
Southern Oregon A's players
Modesto A's players
Tacoma Tigers players
Huntsville Stars players
Louisville Redbirds players
Pawtucket Red Sox players
Major League Baseball infielders
Baseball players from Illinois
St. Louis Cardinals players
Boston Red Sox players
Living people
People from Richland County, Illinois
Mat-Su Miners players